Abdulgadir Ilyas Bakur is a Nigerian-born Qatari football player. He currently plays in the Qatar Stars League for Al-Arabi SC on loan from Al-Sailiya SC.

Bakur was born in Mecca, Saudi Arabia and later obtained Qatari citizenship. He is the older brother of footballer Imran Ilyas Bakur. His talents were discovered by El Jaish coach Mohammed Al Ammari and in 2008, he moved to Qatar at the age of 19. On September 18, 2011, Bakur made his professional debut for El Jaish as starter in a league match against Al-Khor.

International goals
Score and result lists Qatar's goal tally first.

Honours
Qatari 2nd Division
Top scorer (1): 2010–11

References

External links
 El Jaish Profile
 QSL.com.qa Profile
 

Living people
1990 births
Qatari footballers
Qatar international footballers
El Jaish SC players
Umm Salal SC players
Al-Sailiya SC players
Al-Markhiya SC players
Al-Arabi SC (Qatar) players
Qatar Stars League players
Qatari Second Division players
Naturalised citizens of Qatar
Qatari people of Saudi Arabian descent
Saudi Arabian emigrants to Qatar
Association football forwards